Clarksburg Methodist Episcopal Church (also known as Clarksburg United Methodist Church) is a historic Methodist church at 512 County Road 524 in Millstone Township, Monmouth County, New Jersey, United States.

The church was built in 1845 in a Mid-19th Century Revival style. The building was added to the National Register of Historic Places in 1999.

References

External links

Methodist churches in New Jersey
Churches on the National Register of Historic Places in New Jersey
Georgian architecture in New Jersey
Churches completed in 1845
19th-century Methodist church buildings in the United States
Churches in Monmouth County, New Jersey
National Register of Historic Places in Monmouth County, New Jersey
Millstone Township, New Jersey
New Jersey Register of Historic Places